Ankers is a surname. Notable people with the surname include:

Del Ankers (1916–2008), American cinematographer
Evelyn Ankers (1918–1985), British-American actress
Kathleen Ankers (1919–2001), American scenic designer

See also
Anker (name)
Anker (disambiguation)